In Darkness is a 2009 Turkish drama film written and directed by Çağan Irmak.

Plot 
Egemen is an advertising agency clerk in his thirties who has to share a roof with his mentally ill mother, Gülseren. Having to endure his mother's anxieties and mental black outs, his only outlet is his workplace; where he feels he can breathe and escape the hell that is his home, even if it is for a little while. But Egemen's amorous interest in his boss Umay unveils little by little just how much Gulseren has emotionally damaged her son.

See also 
 2009 in film
 Turkish films of 2009

References

External links
 
 

2009 films
2009 drama films
Films set in Turkey
Films directed by Çağan Irmak
Turkish drama films